Marin Miculinić (born 11 April 1971, in Rijeka) is a former Croatian handball player.

He played for RK Zamet for 12 years and was also the sports director of the club between 2001 and 2002.

Sources
Petar Orgulić - 50 godina rukometa u Rijeci (2005), Adria public

References

Croatian male handball players
RK Zamet players
Yugoslav male handball players
Handball players from Rijeka
1971 births
Living people